Henri Tasso (8 October 1882 – 12 February 1944) was a French Socialist politician. He served as the Mayor of Marseille from 1935 to 1939. He also served as a member of the National Assembly from 1924 to 1938, and of the Senate from 1938 to 1945.

Early life
Henri Tasso was born on 8 October 1882 in Marseille. His parents, Michel-Théodore Tasso and Dominique Eusébie Marie Montefrestini, were Italian immigrants to France.

Career
A member of the French Section of the Workers' International (SFIO), he served as a member of the National Assembly from 1924 to 1938. He supported the naturalisation of Italian immigrants, even those who were poor and unemployed.

He served as the Socialist Mayor of Marseille from 1935 to 1939. On 8 October 1938 a fire burnt down Les Nouvelles Galeries, a department store on the Canebière. Shortly after, he was dismissed. Others have argued he was dismissed "because of his inappropriate financial management and chronic overhiring of municipal workers."

He also served as a member of the Senate from 1938 to 1944.

Personal life
He married Thérèse Gairaud.

Death
He died on 12 February 1944 in Allauch.

References

1882 births
1944 deaths
Politicians from Marseille
French people of Italian descent
French Section of the Workers' International politicians
Members of the 13th Chamber of Deputies of the French Third Republic
Members of the 14th Chamber of Deputies of the French Third Republic
Members of the 15th Chamber of Deputies of the French Third Republic
Members of the 16th Chamber of Deputies of the French Third Republic
French Senators of the Third Republic
Senators of Bouches-du-Rhône
Mayors of Marseille